Yolanda Hamilton  (born 26 May 1987) is a Jamaican women's international footballer who played as a defender for the Jamaica women's national football team. She was part of the team at the 2014 CONCACAF Women's Championship. At the club level, she plays for Barbican FC in Jamaica.

References

External links
 Jamaica player profile

1987 births
Living people
Jamaican women's footballers
Place of birth missing (living people)
Women's association football defenders
Jamaica women's international footballers
Barbican F.C. players